Robert Andrew Haw (born 10 October 1986) is an English footballer who plays for Mill Lane United as a striker. He played for York City from 2004 to 2006 after progressing through the youth system.

Career
Born in York, North Yorkshire, Haw grew up in Beverley and played in the York City youth system as a schoolboy and signed a three-year trainee scholarship in July 2003. He made his debut for the reserve team towards the end of the 2002–03 season. His first team debut came at the age of 17 as a 59th minute substitute in a 0–0 draw at Swansea City on 8 May 2004, which was York's last game in the Football League before relegation to the Football Conference. His first appearance of the 2004–05 season came as an 80th-minute substitute in a 0–0 draw at Canvey Island on 16 October, with manager Chris Brass saying "Young Robbie Haw did exceptionally well though. He's been training with the first team and deserved his chance." He made two appearances for York in the 2004–05 season. He failed to make any first team appearances during the 2005–06 season, instead spending the final year of his trainee scholarship playing in the youth team.

He signed for East Riding County League Division One team Mill Lane United in February 2010.

Career statistics

Footnotes

A.  The "League" column constitutes appearances and goals (including those as a substitute) in the Football League and Football Conference.

References

External links

1986 births
Living people
Footballers from York
Sportspeople from Beverley
English footballers
Association football forwards
York City F.C. players
English Football League players
National League (English football) players